A parking violation is the act of parking a motor vehicle in a restricted place or in an unauthorized manner. It is against the law virtually everywhere to park a vehicle in the middle of a highway or road; parking on one or both sides of a road, however, is commonly permitted. However, restrictions apply to such parking, and may result in an offense being committed. Such offenses are usually cited by a police officer or other government official in the form of a traffic ticket.

Examples

Parking violations include, but are not limited to:
 Parking in a prohibited space such as a bus stop, in front of a fire hydrant, a driveway, or a garage entrance.
 Parking on a sidewalk (unless specifically allowed by signs).
 Parking in, too close to, or within an intersection, railroad crossing or crosswalk.
 Double parking.
 Parking at a parking meter without paying, or for longer than the paid time.
 Parking in a handicapped zone without an appropriate permit.
 Parking on the public byway without the vehicle being properly licensed and registered, with expired or missing license plates or license plate 'tabs', without proper safety vehicle inspection decal, etc.
 Parking without a zone permit in places where parking is severely impacted (such as a residential zone permit, issued to help preserve parking availability for those who live in the permit zone).
 Parking without special permit, where one is needed (like a car park for employees of a company).
 Parking with the parking permit or payment receipt not visible in the prescribed way, like upside down.
 Parking on certain streets in a natural disaster when streets need to be cleared to allow fluid movement of emergency vehicles.
 Parking at curb locations designated (usually through signage and/or curb or pavement painting) for special purposes such as passenger zones (for loading and discharge), commercial vehicle zones (for freight or service trucks and vans), police or government vehicle zones, etc.
 Parking at locations during scheduled street sweeping.
 Parking at locations during posted construction or maintenance operations.
 Parking for longer than the maximum time, often that is 24 hours.
 Parking facing against the direction of traffic (considered confusing to moving drivers, especially at night).
 Parking outside marked squares, for example angle parking where only parallel parking is allowed.
 Parking near a red zone.
 Parking during times when parking is prohibited.
 On-street parking when winter weather rules are in force to allow clear access for snowplows.

Fines or parking citations may result if any of the above criteria are met.

United States

In 1926, American merchants listed downtown traffic congestion as their most serious difficulty. Unenforced curbside parking and lack of off-street parking facilities were listed as the primary problems. Customers went where they could park.

During the Great Depression, city revenues dwindled. With parking meters, however, a new source of municipal revenue was found. Not only did the nickels paid in by parkers accumulate, but so did the fines imposed for over parking. By 1944, American cities were generating some $10 million annually from parking meters alone. Soon after came meter maids, who, because they were paid less than police officers, increased city revenues further. Complex parking rules, restrictions and regulations are now an integral part of modern life and landscape.

Typically, a ticket is placed on a vehicle when the owner or driver is not present. There is no place for a signature, and in California, the registered owner cannot be charged with a misdemeanor or other criminal offense for ignoring a ticket. A letter will usually be sent prior to any punitive action. Most jurisdictions, however, will have sanctions such as refusal to allow renewal of license plates if the owner of the vehicle has unpaid parking tickets. In some jurisdictions, such as New York City, a vehicle may be towed if it has overdue parking fines exceeding a specified balance and subjected to impounded vehicle auction if unredeemed. In many jurisdictions, such as Boston, vehicles with numerous outstanding parking citations are subject to booting.

Europe

In Europe, parking tickets are heavily used. In Sweden, parking violations on street are considered traffic crimes with a fine. If the fine is not objected to or paid within a specified time, the Swedish Enforcement Administration will claim money from bank accounts or other assets, relatively fast. The owner will be noted as a bad payer, and will not get a loan or a new rental apartment etc. for three years. A parking violation in an off-street parking place is considered a break of contract which results in a penalty fee with different rules. According to statistics from Stockholm the cars with the highest number of parking violations (weighted for number of cars) are Jeep, Mercedes-Benz, Porsche and Lexus. Mercedes-Benz owners were the worst for parking in disabled spaces. Professor Gunnar Aronsson at the department for psychology at Stockholm university believes this is due to the owners being well-off and thinking that their time is more important. According to Jan Prestberg at the traffic office in Stockholm, the fines are low enough to be ignored by richer people. It is often hard to find parking spots in big cities. After wheel-locks were introduced in London, the prices for rented parking spaces went up considerably.

In addition to "no parking" signs, "no waiting" and "no stopping" are used in the UK and Europe. "No waiting" allows passengers to be dropped off or picked up, but does not allow parking or waiting with the driver in the vehicle for long periods.  Loading and unloading are usually also allowed, details and applicable times may be shown on a plate under the sign.  "No stopping" does not allow waiting at all, even for drop offs and pick ups.

Foreign-registered vehicles in Europe in reality cannot be fined. This is partly because it is too much work to find the owner in a foreign country, but mainly because it is not legally possible to claim money from a foreign resident person if they don't pay voluntarily. The European Union is introducing legislation into all member countries to collect fines across borders. In some cities, like London, this has been solved by locking one wheel of an unlawfully parked vehicle. The driver has to pay to be able to drive the vehicle.

New Zealand
In New Zealand, parking fines are mostly issued by council parking officers, but can also be issued by police officers. Parking tickets are mostly attached to an unattended vehicle, or they can be posted to the address of the registered owner. Usually, the most common parking fines issued are those for parking over the time limit.

Australia
Parking fines were introduced in the 1950s in New South Wales, Australia. At that time, council rangers only worked in council car parks and parking fines on the streets, mainly in Sydney were issued by the NSW Parking Police. These were employees of the New South Wales Police Force. Up until about 1995, these fines were issued and processed by the NSW Police and the fines were processed by the traffic penalties section of the police. This section was mostly staffed by clerical staff employed by the police. However they were not members of the police force. If fines were unpaid, the courts could decide on a penalty, and if then unpaid, a warrant would be made out and a person could spend time in jail to cover the amount of the fine. Now the system is different with the State Debt Recovery Office handling the fines.

Ancient Assyria
Possibly the first parking restrictions were put in place in Nineveh, the capital of ancient Assyria in c.700 BC. The restrictions were made by their king Sennacherib (704 to 681 BC) and pertained to the sacred main processional way through Nineveh. The oldest parking signs ever discovered read "Royal Road – let no man decrease it". The penalty for parking a chariot on this road was death followed by impaling outside one's own home.

Gallery

See also
 Overspill parking
 Predatory towing
 Traffic ticket
 Carwalking

References

External links 

 No Parking, 'No Parking' notice in all 6 UN official languages (Arabic, Chinese, English, Español, Français, Russian), for download in PDF & DJVU formats. DIN A4.

Parking law
Vehicle law
Articles containing video clips